Danzel Becker (21 January 1948 – 21 April 2017) was a South African cricketer and umpire. He played first-class cricket from 1969 to 1975, and umpired sixteen ODI games between 1997 and 2001.

See also
 List of One Day International cricket umpires

References

External links

1948 births
2017 deaths
Northerns cricketers
Gauteng cricketers
South African One Day International cricket umpires
People from Pretoria